Patrick Jay Miletich (born March 9, 1966) is a retired American mixed martial artist and former sports commentator. He is known for his fights in the Ultimate Fighting Championship, where he became the first UFC Welterweight Champion and UFC 16 Welterweight Tournament Winner. Miletich is also known as a highly successful trainer and coach, having founded Miletich Fighting Systems. This camp is considered one of the most successful in MMA history and has produced several world champions. On July 6, 2014, he was inducted into the UFC Hall of Fame.

Early life
Miletich, the youngest of five children, was born in Davenport, Iowa, to second generation Croatian immigrant parents. Two of his brothers are deceased. Miletich started wrestling at the age of five, continuing at Bettendorf High School. Miletich also played high school football in Bettendorf Bulldogs and was an All-State nose guard in his senior year. As a senior in 1983-84, Miletich shared the Bettendorf High School wrestling room with future MMA champion Mark Kerr, who was a freshman just beginning his wrestling career. He said he wanted to be a world champion in something and wrestling was something he was good at. Although Miletich originally planned to pursue football after graduating high school, he eventually chose to wrestle in junior college. When his mother developed heart problems, he left school to care for her. Miletich has stated in past interviews that he actually began fighting to help pay her bills.

Mixed martial arts career

Early career
Miletich started his MMA training at 26. Before this, Miletich trained at Tarpein's Dojo in, Davenport, IA with Grand Master Nick Tarpein, where he learned much of what he knows about karate, and was introduced to Brazilian Jiu-Jitsu for the very first time. With Miletich's wrestling background, Jiu-Jitsu came naturally to him. When Miletich coupled BJJ with his strong foundation in boxing/karate, he realized where his fighting career should go; MMA. After learning the foundations of BJJ in Tarpein's Dojo, Miletich decided to branch out and learn BJJ full-time. A friend from Chicago got him into a Renzo Gracie seminar.

After training in jiu-jitsu for a year, the same friend then got him into the Battle of the Masters, an MMA tournament held in Chicago in 1995. Miletich continued fighting at smaller events and enjoyed success. He was undefeated through 15 fights before losing to Matt Hume.

Ultimate Fighting Championship
Three fights later Miletich fought in UFC 16 and won the first UFC Welterweight tournament.

Welterweight champion
At UFC 17.5: Ultimate Brazil, Miletich defeated Mikey Burnett to become the first UFC Welterweight Champion.
In his fifth title defense at UFC 31 he suffered his first UFC loss as he lost the championship to Carlos Newton by submission. According to Miletich, he had a rematch clause in his contract but it was bypassed by the organization as Miletich's camp already had multiple high-ranked fighters in the welterweight division.

His next fight was a KO win over Shonie Carter at UFC 32.

Move up to middleweight
After the fight with Carter, Miletich moved up to the Middleweight division. This was also partly due to encouragement by UFC management and because his teammate, Matt Hughes, defeated Carlos Newton to win the UFC Welterweight Championship. Miletich returned to fight at his new weight at UFC 36, but quickly lost to Matt Lindland. Miletich decided to take some time away from professional fighting and recover from numerous chronic injuries. Miletich was scheduled to fight Frank Trigg at WFA 3 but pulled out due to injury. He returned in September 2006 to fight Renzo Gracie in an IFL superfight, and submitted to a guillotine choke in the first round. Miletich spoke briefly after the fight about re-aggravating his old neck injury before the Gracie fight. Miletich's last fight was in December 2008 where he scored a second-round KO over Thomas Denny that was televised on the HDNet network.

Over a decade since his last mixed martial arts bout, Miletich was originally scheduled to face Michael Nunn in a kickboxing match on April 18, 2020. However, the bout was rescheduled to July 18, 2020, due to the COVID-19 pandemic. Miletich lost to Nunn via split decision.

Fighter coaching
Miletich founded Miletich Fighting Systems, a mixed martial arts academy in his hometown of Bettendorf, Iowa. MFS has trained over 90 televised fighters and 11 MMA world champions, including former two-time UFC Welterweight Champion and UFC Hall of Famer Matt Hughes, former two-time UFC Heavyweight Champion Tim Sylvia, former UFC Lightweight Champion Jens Pulver, and former EliteXC Middleweight Champion and former UFC Welterweight Champion Robbie Lawler.

Law enforcement/military training 
For over 15 years Miletich has trained local, state, and federal law-enforcement officers and military groups from all service branches, including special-operations groups attached to those branches. He has also written and designed defensive tactics and combatives courses for other combatives companies.

Miletich is also the co-founder of Fire Horse combatives which trains LEO and military personnel.

Miletich was the primary subject matter of L. Jon Wertheim's "Blood in the Cage: Mixed Martial Arts, Pat Miletich, and the Furious Rise of the UFC", which detailed Miletich's biography and his fighting camp (Miletich Fighting Systems).

Commentary 

Miletich began providing color commentary for Strikeforce on April 11, 2009, for its debut on Showtime and did so regularly until that promotion's demise in 2012.

Miletich was color commentary for ESPN's MMA Live and Legacy Fighting Alliance on UFC Fight Pass. On January 12, 2021 Pat Miletich was fired from his commentary position at Legacy Fighting Alliance for being present in Washington D.C. at the 2021 storming of the United States Capitol, although he had no involvement.

Personal life 
Miletich is married and has three daughters. He is a Freemason.

Miletich was arrested on June 29, 2020, in Moline, Illinois and was charged with DUI. This was Miletich's second DUI arrest, his first coming in September 2018, a charge to which he pleaded guilty in March 2019.

Championships and accomplishments 
Ultimate Fighting Championship
 UFC Hall of Fame
 UFC Welterweight Championship (One time, first)
 Four successful title defenses
 UFC 16 Welterweight Tournament Winner
Sherdog
Mixed Martial Arts Hall of Fame
George Tragos/Lou Thesz Professional Wrestling Hall of Fame
George Tragos Award (2011)
'''Resurrection Fighting Alliance & AXS TV
Lifetime Achievement Award

Mixed martial arts record 

|-
| Win
| align=center| 
| Thomas Denny
| KO (punches)
| Adrenaline MMA 2
| 
| align=center| 2
| align=center| 0:50
| Moline, Illinois, United States
| 
|-
| Loss
| align=center| 28–7–2
| Renzo Gracie
| Submission (guillotine choke)
| IFL 9
| 
| align=center| 1
| align=center| 3:37
| Moline, Illinois, United States
| 
|-
| Loss
| align=center| 28–6–2
| Matt Lindland
| TKO (punches)
| UFC 36
| 
| align=center| 1
| align=center| 3:09
| Las Vegas, Nevada, United States
| 
|-
| Win
| align=center| 28–5–2
| Shonie Carter
| KO (head kick)
| UFC 32
| 
| align=center| 2
| align=center| 2:42
| East Rutherford, New Jersey, United States
| 
|-
| Loss
| align=center| 27–5–2
| Carlos Newton
| Submission (bulldog choke)
| UFC 31
| 
| align=center| 3
| align=center| 2:50
| Atlantic City, New Jersey, United States
| 
|-
| Win
| align=center| 27–4–2
| Kenichi Yamamoto
| Submission (guillotine choke)
| UFC 29
| 
| align=center| 2
| align=center| 1:58
| Tokyo, Japan
| 
|-
| Loss
| align=center| 26–4–2
| Kiyoshi Tamura
| Decision (majority)
| Rings: Millennium Combine 3
| 
| align=center| 2
| align=center| 5:00
| Yokohama, Japan
| 
|-
| Win
| align=center| 26–3–2
| John Alessio
| Submission (armbar)
| UFC 26
| 
| align=center| 2
| align=center| 1:43
| Cedar Rapids, Iowa, United States
| 
|-
| Loss
| align=center| 25–3–2
| José Landi-Jons
| TKO (corner stoppage)
| WEF 8 - Goin' Platinum 
| 
| align=center| 1
| align=center| 8:00
| Rome, Georgia, United States
| 
|-
| Win
| align=center| 25–2–2
| Shonie Carter
| Decision (unanimous)
| Extreme Challenge 27
| 
| align=center| 1
| align=center| 20:00
| Davenport, Iowa, United States
| 
|-
| Win
| align=center| 24–2–2
| André Pederneiras
| TKO (doctor stoppage)
| UFC 21
| 
| align=center| 2
| align=center| 2:20
| Cedar Rapids, Iowa, United States
| 
|-
| Win
| align=center| 23–2–2
| Clayton Miller
| Submission (triangle choke)
| Cage Combat 2
| 
| align=center| 1
| align=center| 0:40
| Ottumwa, Iowa, United States
| 
|-
| Loss
| align=center| 22–2–2
| Jutaro Nakao
| Technical Submission (triangle choke)
| SuperBrawl 11
| 
| align=center| 1
| align=center| 9:22
| Honolulu, Hawaii, United States
| 
|-
| Win
| align=center| 22–1–2
| Jorge Patino
| Decision (unanimous)
| UFC 18
| 
| align=center| 1
| align=center| 21:00
| New Orleans, Louisiana, United States
| 
|-
| Win
| align=center| 21–1–2
| Mikey Burnett
| Decision (split)
| UFC Brazil
| 
| align=center| 1
| align=center| 21:00
| São Paulo, Brazil
| 
|-
|  Draw
| align=center| 20–1–2
| Dan Severn
| Draw
| Extreme Challenge 20
| 
| align=center| 1
| align=center| 20:00
| Davenport, Iowa, United States
| 
|-
| Win
| align=center| 20–1–1
| Al Buck, Jr.
| Submission (choke)
| Midwest Shootfighting 1
| 
| align=center| 2
| align=center| 2:49
| Clinton, Iowa, United States
| 
|-
| Win
| align=center| 19–1–1
| Chris Brennan
| Submission (shoulder choke)
| rowspan=2| UFC 16
| rowspan=2| 
| align=center| 1
| align=center| 9:02
| rowspan=2| New Orleans, Louisiana, United States
| 
|-
| Win
| align=center| 18–1–1
| Townsend Saunders
| Decision (split)
| align=center| 1
| align=center| 15:00
|
|-
| Win
| align=center| 17–1–1
| Chris Brennan
| Decision (unanimous)
| EC - Extreme Challenge Trials
| 
| align=center| 1
| align=center| 10:00
| Davenport, Iowa, United States
| 
|-
|  Draw
| align=center| 16–1–1
| Chris Brennan
| Draw (majority)
| Extreme Challenge 9
| 
| align=center| 1
| align=center| 20:00
| Davenport, Iowa, United States
| 
|-
| Win
| align=center| 16–1
| Chuck Kim
| Submission (rear-naked choke)
| Extreme Challenge 7
| 
| align=center| 1
| align=center| 10:46
| Council Bluffs, Iowa, United States
| 
|-
| Loss
| align=center| 15–1
| Matt Hume
| TKO (doctor stoppage)
| Extreme Fighting 4
| 
| align=center| 1
| align=center| 5:00
| Des Moines, Iowa, United States
| 
|-
| Win
| align=center| 15–0
| Chad Cox
| TKO (submission to punch)
| Extreme Challenge 3
| 
| align=center| 1
| align=center| 1:48
| Davenport, Iowa, United States
| 
|-
| Win
| align=center| 14–0
| Paul Kimbro
| Submission (armbar)
| Extreme Challenge 2
| 
| align=center| 1
| align=center| 5:13
| Des Moines, Iowa, United States
| 
|-
| Win
| align=center| 13–0
| Jason Nicholson
| Decision (unanimous)
| SuperBrawl 3
| 
| align=center| 1
| align=center| 15:00
| Honolulu, Hawaii, United States
| 
|-
| Win
| align=center| 12–0
| Earl Loucks
| Submission (americana)
| Extreme Challenge 1
| 
| align=center| 1
| align=center| 7:00
| Des Moines, Iowa, United States
| 
|-
| Win
| align=center| 11–0
| Pat Assalone
| Submission (armbar)
| Brawl at the Ballpark 1
| 
| align=center| 1
| align=center| 4:01
| Davenport, Iowa, United States
| 
|-
| Win
| align=center| 10–0
| Matt Andersen
| TKO (submission to punches)
| Gladiators 1
| 
| align=center| 1
| align=center| 5:21
| Davenport, Iowa, United States
| 
|-
| Win
| align=center| 9–0
| Yasunori Matsumoto
| TKO (doctor stoppage)
| QCU 2
| 
| align=center| 1
| align=center| 15:53
| Moline, Illinois, United States
| 
|-
| Win
| align=center| 8–0
| Andrey Dudko
| Submission (rear-naked choke)
| rowspan=3| BOTM 2
| rowspan=3| 
| align=center| 1
| align=center| 2:49
| rowspan=3| Illinois, United States
| 
|-
| Win
| align=center| 7–0
| Bob Gholson
| KO (punches)
| align=center| 1
| align=center| 2:20
| 
|-
| Win
| align=center| 6–0
| Rick Graveson
| Submission (rear-naked choke)
| align=center| 1
| align=center| 0:46
| 
|-
| Win
| align=center| 5–0
| Rick Graveson
| Submission (rear-naked choke)
| rowspan=2| QCU 1
| rowspan=2| 
| align=center| 1
| align=center| 1:53
| rowspan=2| Moline, Illinois, United States
| 
|-
| Win
| align=center| 4–0
| Ed McLennan
| Submission (armbar)
| align=center| 1
| align=center| 1:28
| 
|-
| Win
| align=center| 3–0
| Kevin Marino
| Submission (rear-naked choke)
| rowspan=3| BOTM 1
| rowspan=3| 
| align=center| 1
| align=center| 3:49
| rowspan=3| Chicago, Illinois, United States
| 
|-
| Win
| align=center| 2–0
| Angelo Rivera
| Submission (rear-naked choke)
| align=center| 1
| align=center| 1:40
| 
|-
| Win
| align=center| 1–0
| Yasunori Matsumoto
| Submission (rear-naked choke)
| align=center| 1
| align=center| 7:40
|

Professional boxing record 

{|class="wikitable" style="text-align:center; font-size:95%"
|-
!
!Result
!Record
!Opponent
!Method
!Round, time
!Date
!Location
!Notes
|- 
|1
|Win
|1–0
|align=left| Donald Tucker
|
|4
|Jan 20, 1999 
|align=left| 
|

References

External links
 
 

1966 births
Living people
Sportspeople from Davenport, Iowa
American people of Croatian descent
American male mixed martial artists
Mixed martial artists from Iowa
Welterweight mixed martial artists
Boxers from Iowa
Cruiserweight boxers
American practitioners of Brazilian jiu-jitsu
People awarded a black belt in Brazilian jiu-jitsu
American submission wrestlers
American Muay Thai practitioners
American male karateka
Mixed martial artists utilizing Shuri-ryū
Mixed martial artists utilizing boxing
Mixed martial artists utilizing collegiate wrestling
Mixed martial artists utilizing Muay Thai
Mixed martial artists utilizing Brazilian jiu-jitsu
Ultimate Fighting Championship champions
Mixed martial arts broadcasters
American Freemasons
American male boxers
Ultimate Fighting Championship male fighters
Bettendorf High School alumni